Kim Jong-il, former leader of North Korea, received numerous titles during his rule. Despite his death in 2011, he is currently the Eternal Chairman of the National Defense Commission of the Republic.

Usage of North Korean media 
When he is mentioned in North Korean media and publications, he is most commonly referred to as "Great Leader Comrade Kim Jong-il" (Korean:위대한 령도자 김정일동지) or "General" (Korean: 장군님). 

Like his father and son, when his name is written, it is always emphasised by a special bold font or in a larger font size, for example: "The great leader Comrade  provides on-the-spot guidance to the Ragwon Machine Complex." or "The great leader Comrade  provides on-the-spot guidance to the Ragwon Machine Complex."

List of official titles and offices

Official titles

Held offices and titles

List of propagated titles

See also

Held titles 
 Chairman of the National Defence Commission of North Korea
 General Secretary of the Workers' Party of Korea
 Supreme Commander of the Korean People's Army
 Eternal leaders of North Korea

Related 

 List of Kim Il-sung's titles
List of Kim Jong-un's titles

References

Kim Jong-il
Kim Jong-il
Propaganda in North Korea